Loveland is the second solo album by John Sykes, released in 1997. The record was originally pitched to Sykes by Mercury Records' Japanese branch as a seven-track extended play of ballads. Eventually Sykes decided to expand the project into a full-length album. The track "Don't Hurt Me This Way" is a re-recording of Sykes' 1982 single "Please Don't Leave Me", which features late Thin Lizzy frontman Phil Lynott.

Track listing
All songs written and composed by John Sykes, except where noted.

Personnel
Credits are adapted from the album's liner notes.

References

1997 albums
John Sykes albums
Albums produced by John Sykes